Pine Hill is an unincorporated community in Rusk County, located in the U.S. state of Texas. According to the Handbook of Texas, the community had a population of 49 in 2000. It is located within the Longview, Texas metropolitan area.

History
The area in what is known as Pine Hill today was first settled in 1844 by Uncle Henderson Hillin. It was given the nickname Rake Pocket from two different sources. One source says that a man thought he had been overcharged at the local hotel, while another claims that Hillin had to literally "rake his pockets" to feed his animals while traveling through here in an oxcart. He then encouraged his family members from Alabama and Georgia to relocate to the area when he started farming four years after settling here. He served as the town merchant for nearly half a century. A post office was established in 1847 and remained in operation until sometime after 1930, with James W. Clark as the first postmaster. The community then received its mail from Sharon in 1856, but moved back to Pine Hill that next year. It was the size of a normal town even after the American Civil War. The Timpson and Henderson Railway caused Pine Hill to become a bastion for lumber production from 1909 to 1922. A newspaper called the Pinehill Times was established in 1913. A fire destroyed ten businesses three years later, while another fire struck in 1937. The town had five businesses and 250 residents in 1940. In the next decade, the population plummeted to 100 and then to 49 from 1968 through 2000.

Geography

Education
Today, the community is served by the Henderson Independent School District.

References

Unincorporated communities in Cherokee County, Texas
Unincorporated communities in Texas